Henry Churchill King (1858–1934) was an American Congregationalist theologian, educator, and author.

At Oberlin College from 1884, he taught in mathematics, philosophy, and theology. From 1902 to 1927, he was president of the college. With a tenure of 25 years, he is Oberlin's longest-serving president.
In 1919, he served on the King-Crane Commission, which provided recommendations on the fair and just disposition of non-Turkish areas of the Ottoman Empire. The findings of that commission, suppressed until 1922, were made public in the King-Crane Commission Report and conveyed the sentiment of the indigenous peoples of the region as to who would be entrusted with the various mandates, the future of Palestine, and other vital issues.

He was prominent in the councils of the Congregational Church and a moderator (1919–21) of its National Council as well as chairman (1921–27) of the Congregational Foundation for Education.

Bibliography 
 Reconstruction in Theology (1901)
 Rational Living (1905)
 The Ethics of Jesus (1910)
Fundamental Questions (1917)
For A New America In A New World (1919)
 The King-Crane Commission Report (August 28, 1919)
Seeing Life Whole (1923)

References

External links
 
 

1858 births
1934 deaths
Presidents of Oberlin College
People from Hillsdale, Michigan